Events in the year 2011 in Ukraine.

Incumbents 

 President: Viktor Yanukovych
 Prime Minister: Mykola Azarov

Events 

 29 July – An explosion occurs  underground in the Sukhodilska–Skhidna coal mine in Southeast Ukraine in Luhansk Oblast, killing all 26 miners.

Deaths

References 

 
Ukraine
Ukraine
2010s in Ukraine
Years of the 21st century in Ukraine